

Events

Pre-1600
 587 – Treaty of Andelot: King Guntram of Burgundy recognizes Childebert II as his heir.
 936 – Shi Jingtang is enthroned as the first emperor of the Later Jin by Emperor Taizong of Liao, following a revolt against Emperor Fei of Later Tang.
1443 – Skanderbeg and his forces liberate Kruja in central Albania and raise the Albanian flag.
1470 – Champa–Đại Việt War: Emperor Lê Thánh Tông of Đại Việt formally launches his attack against Champa.
1520 – After 38 days, an expedition under the command of Ferdinand Magellan completes the first passage through the Strait of Magellan and enters the Pacific Ocean.
1582 – In Stratford-upon-Avon, William Shakespeare and Anne Hathaway pay a  bond in lieu of posting wedding banns, which enables them to marry immediately.

1601–1900
1627 – The Polish–Lithuanian Commonwealth Navy has its greatest and last naval victory in the Battle of Oliwa.
1660 – At Gresham College, twelve men, including Christopher Wren, Robert Boyle, John Wilkins, and Sir Robert Moray decide to found what is later known as the Royal Society.
1666 – At least 3,000 men of the Royal Scots Army led by Tam Dalyell of the Binns defeat about 900 Covenanter insurgents led by James Wallace of Auchens in the Battle of Rullion Green.
1785 – The first Treaty of Hopewell is signed, by which the United States acknowledges Cherokee lands in what is now East Tennessee.
1798 – Trade between the United States and modern-day Uruguay begins when John Leamy's frigate John arrives in Montevideo.
1811 – Beethoven's Piano Concerto No. 5 in E-flat major, Op. 73, premieres at the Gewandhaus in Leipzig.
1814 – The Times of London becomes the first newspaper to be produced on a steam-powered printing press, built by the German team of Koenig & Bauer.
1821 – Panama Independence Day: Panama separates from Spain and joins Gran Colombia.
1843 – Ka Lā Hui (Hawaiian Independence Day): The Kingdom of Hawaii is officially recognized by the United Kingdom and France as an independent nation.
1861 – American Civil War: The Confederate States of America accept a rival state government's pronouncement that declares Missouri to be the 12th state of the Confederacy.
1862 – American Civil War: In the Battle of Cane Hill, Union troops under General James G. Blunt defeat General John Marmaduke's Confederates.
1885 – Bulgarian victory in the Serbo-Bulgarian War preserves the Unification of Bulgaria.
1893 – Women's suffrage in New Zealand concludes with the 1893 New Zealand general election.
1895 – The first American automobile race takes place over the 54 miles from Chicago's Jackson Park to Evanston, Illinois. Frank Duryea wins in approximately 10 hours.
1899 – The Second Boer War: A British column is engaged by Boer forces at the Battle of Modder River; although the Boers withdraw, the British suffer heavy casualties.

1901–present
1905 – Irish nationalist Arthur Griffith founds Sinn Féin as a political party with the main aim of establishing a dual monarchy in Ireland.
1908 – A mine explosion in Marianna, Pennsylvania, kills 154 men, leaving only one survivor. 
1912 – Albania declares its independence from the Ottoman Empire.
1914 – World War I: Following a war-induced closure in July, the New York Stock Exchange re-opens for bond trading.
1917 – The Estonian Provincial Assembly declares itself the sovereign power of Estonia.
1918 – The Soviet Forces moved against Estonia when the 6th Red Rifle Division struck the border town of Narva, which marked the beginning of the Estonian War of Independence.
1919 – Lady Astor is elected as a Member of the Parliament of the United Kingdom. She is the first woman to sit in the House of Commons. (Countess Markievicz, the first to be elected, refused to sit.)
1920 – FIDAC (The Interallied Federation of War Veterans Organisations), the first international organization of war veterans is established in Paris, France.
  1920   – Irish War of Independence: Kilmichael Ambush: The Irish Republican Army ambush a convoy of British Auxiliaries and kill seventeen.
1925 – The Grand Ole Opry begins broadcasting in Nashville, Tennessee, as the WSM Barn Dance.
1942 – In Boston, Massachusetts, a fire in the Cocoanut Grove nightclub kills 492 people.
1943 – World War II: Tehran Conference: U.S. President Franklin D. Roosevelt, British Prime Minister Winston Churchill and Soviet Premier Joseph Stalin meet in Tehran, Iran, to discuss war strategy.
1958 – Chad, the Republic of the Congo, and Gabon become autonomous republics within the French Community.
  1958   – First successful flight of SM-65 Atlas; the first operational intercontinental ballistic missile (ICBM), developed by the United States and the first member of the Atlas rocket family.
1960 – Mauritania becomes independent of France.
1964 – Mariner program: NASA launches the Mariner 4 probe toward Mars.
  1964   – Vietnam War: National Security Council members agree to recommend that U.S. President Lyndon B. Johnson adopt a plan for a two-stage escalation of bombing in North Vietnam.
1965 – Vietnam War: In response to U.S. President Lyndon B. Johnson's call for "more flags" in Vietnam, Philippine President-elect Ferdinand Marcos announces he will send troops to help fight in South Vietnam.
1966 – Michel Micombero overthrows the monarchy of Burundi and makes himself the first president.
1967 – The first pulsar (PSR B1919+21, in the constellation of Vulpecula) is discovered by two astronomers Jocelyn Bell Burnell and Antony Hewish.
1971 – Fred Quilt, a leader of the Tsilhqot'in First Nation suffers severe abdominal injuries allegedly caused by Royal Canadian Mounted Police officers; he dies two days later.
  1971   – Wasfi al-Tal, Prime Minister of Jordan, is assassinated by the Black September unit of the Palestine Liberation Organization.
1972 – Last executions in Paris: Claude Buffet and Roger Bontems are guillotined at La Santé Prison.
1975 – East Timor declares its independence from Portugal.
1979 – Air New Zealand Flight 901, a DC-10 sightseeing flight over Antarctica, crashes into Mount Erebus, killing all 257 people on board.
1980 – Iran–Iraq War: Operation Morvarid: The bulk of the Iraqi Navy is destroyed by the Iranian Navy in the Persian Gulf. (Commemorated in Iran as Navy Day.)
1987 – South African Airways Flight 295 crashes into the Indian Ocean, killing all 159 people on board.
1989 – Cold War: Velvet Revolution: In the face of protests, the Communist Party of Czechoslovakia announces it will give up its monopoly on political power.
1990 – British Prime Minister Margaret Thatcher resigns as leader of the Conservative Party and, therefore, as Prime Minister. She is succeeded in both positions by John Major.
1991 – South Ossetia declares independence from Georgia.
2002 – Suicide bombers blow up an Israeli-owned hotel in Mombasa, Kenya; their colleagues fail in their attempt to bring down Arkia Israel Airlines Flight 582 with surface-to-air missiles.
2010 – Sun Way Flight 4112 crashes after takeoff from Jinnah International Airport in Karachi, Pakistan, killing 12 people.
2014 – Gunmen set off three bombs at the central mosque in the northern Nigerian city of Kano killing at least 120 people.
2016 – A chartered Avro RJ85 plane carrying at least 77 people, including the Chapecoense football team, crashes near Medellín, Colombia.
2020 – Over seven hundred civilians are massacred by the Ethiopian National Defense Force and Eritrean Army in Aksum, Ethiopia.

Births

Pre-1600
1118 – Manuel I Komnenos, Byzantine emperor (d. 1180)
1293 – Yesün Temür, Chinese emperor (d. 1328)
1470 – Wen Zhengming, artist during the Ming dynasty (d. 1559)
1489 – Margaret Tudor, Queen of James IV of Scotland, daughter of Henry VII of England (d. 1541)
1570 – James Whitelocke, English judge and politician, Chief Justice of Chester (d. 1632)
1592 – Hong Taiji, Emperor of China (d. 1643)
1598 – Hans Nansen, Danish lawyer and politician (d. 1667)

1601–1900
1628 – John Bunyan, English preacher, theologian, and author (d. 1688)
1631 – Abraham Brueghel, Flemish Baroque painter (d. 1690)
1632 – Jean-Baptiste Lully, Italian-French composer and manager (d. 1687)
1640 – Willem de Vlamingh, Flemish captain and explorer (d. 1698)
1661 – Edward Hyde, 3rd Earl of Clarendon, English soldier and politician, 14th Colonial Governor of New York (d. 1723)
1681 – Jean Cavalier, French rebel leader (d. 1740)
1682 – Betty Parris, woman from Salem in Massachusetts who accused others of being witches (d. 1760)
1694 – Leopold, Prince of Anhalt-Köthen (d. 1728)
1700 – Nathaniel Bliss, English astronomer and mathematician (d. 1764)
  1700   – Sophie Magdalene of Brandenburg-Kulmbach (d. 1770)
1757 – William Blake, English poet and painter (d. 1827)
1760 – Maria Teresa Poniatowska, Polish noblewoman (d. 1834)
1772 – Luke Howard, English chemist and meteorologist (d. 1864)
1774 – Maria Antonia of Parma (d. 1841)
1785 – Victor de Broglie, French lawyer and politician, 9th Prime Minister of France (d. 1870)
1792 – Victor Cousin, French philosopher and academic (d. 1867)
1793 – Carl Jonas Love Almqvist, Swedish poet, composer, and critic (d. 1866)
1804 – William Weston, English-Australian politician, 3rd Premier of Tasmania (d. 1888) 
1805 – John Lloyd Stephens, American archaeologist and explorer (d. 1852)
1810 – William Froude, English engineer and architect (d. 1879)
1820 – Friedrich Engels, German-English philosopher, economist, and journalist (d. 1895)
1829 – Anton Rubinstein, Russian pianist, composer, and conductor (d. 1894)
1837 – John Wesley Hyatt, American engineer (d. 1920)
1853 – Helen Magill White, American academic (d. 1944)
1857 – Alfonso XII of Spain (d. 1885)
1861 – Adina Emilia De Zavala, American teacher, historian and preservationist of Texas history (d. 1955)
1864 – James Allen, English author and poet (d. 1912)
  1864   – Lindley Miller Garrison, American lawyer and politician, 46th United States Secretary of War (d. 1932)
1866 – Henry Bacon, American architect, designed the Lincoln Memorial (d. 1924)
1876 – Bert Vogler, South African cricketer (d. 1946)
1880 – Alexander Blok, Russian poet and playwright (d. 1921)
1881 – Stefan Zweig, Austrian author, playwright, and journalist (d. 1942)
1887 – Ernst Röhm, German soldier and politician (d. 1934)
1891 – Gregorio Perfecto, Filipino journalist, jurist, and politician (d. 1949)
  1891   – Mabel Alvarez, American painter (d. 1985)
1894 – Brooks Atkinson, American theatre critic (d. 1984)
  1894   – Henry Hazlitt, American economist and philosopher (d. 1993)
1895 – José Iturbi, Spanish pianist and conductor (d. 1980)
1896 – Dawn Powell, American author and playwright (d. 1965)
  1896   – Lilia Skala, Austrian-American actress (d. 1994)
1898 – İhap Hulusi Görey, Turkish graphic artist (d. 1986)
1900 – Mary Bothwell, Canadian classical vocalist and painter (d. 1985)

1901–present
1903 – Gladys O'Connor, English-Canadian actress (d. 2012)
1904 – James Eastland, American planter and politician (d. 1986)
  1904   – Nancy Mitford, English journalist and author (d. 1973)
1906 – Henry Picard, American golfer (d. 1997)
1907 – Rose Bampton, American soprano and educator (d. 2007)
  1907   – Alberto Moravia, Italian journalist and author (d. 1990)
1908 – Michael Adekunle Ajasin, Nigerian educator and politician, 3rd Governor of Ondo State (d. 1997)
1908 – Claude Lévi-Strauss, Belgian-French anthropologist and ethnologist (d. 2009)
1910 – Elsie Quarterman, American ecologist and academic (d. 2014)
1911 – Václav Renč, Czech poet and playwright (d. 1973)
1912 – Morris Louis, American painter (d. 1962)
1913 – Cliff Addison, English chemist and academic (d. 1994)
1915 – Evald Okas, Estonian painter and academic (d. 2011)
  1915   – Yves Thériault, Canadian author (d. 1983)
1916 – Lilian, Princess of Réthy (d. 2002)
  1916   – Ramón José Velásquez, Venezuelan journalist, lawyer, and politician, President of Venezuela (d. 2014)
1919 – Keith Miller, Australian cricketer, footballer, and pilot (d. 2004)
1923 – Helen Delich Bentley, American politician (d. 2016)
  1923   – Gloria Grahame, American actress (d. 1981)
1924 – Dennis Brutus, South African journalist, poet, and academic (d. 2009)
  1924   – Johanna Döbereiner, Czech-Brazilian agronomist and academic (d. 2000)
1925 – József Bozsik, Hungarian footballer and manager (d. 1978)
  1925   – Gigi Gryce, American saxophonist and composer (d. 1983)
1927 – Abdul Halim of Kedah, Yang di-Pertuan Agong of Malaysia (d. 2017)
1928 – Arthur Melvin Okun, American economist and academic (d. 1980)
  1928   – Piet Steenbergen, Dutch footballer and manager (d. 2010)
1929 – Berry Gordy, Jr., American songwriter and producer, founded Motown Records
1930 – A.L. "Doodle" Owens, American country music songwriter and singer (d. 1999)
1932 – Gato Barbieri, Argentinian saxophonist and composer (d. 2016)
  1932   – Terence Frisby, English author and playwright (d. 2020)
1933 – Joe Knollenberg, American soldier and politician (d. 2018)
  1933   – Hope Lange, American actress (d. 2003)
1935 – Frik du Preez, South African rugby player
  1935   – Randolph Stow, Australian-English author and poet (d. 2010)
1936 – Gary Hart, American lawyer and politician, 6th United States Special Envoy for Northern Ireland
1938 – Peter Dimond, Australian rugby league player (d. 2021)
1940 – Bruce Channel, American singer-songwriter
1941 – Laura Antonelli, Italian actress (d. 2015)
  1942   – Paul Warfield, American football player and sportscaster
1943 – R. B. Greaves, Guyanese-American singer-songwriter (d. 2012)
  1943   – Randy Newman, American singer-songwriter, composer, and pianist
1944 – Rita Mae Brown, American novelist, poet, and screenwriter
1945 – Franklin Drilon, Filipino lawyer and politician, 22nd President of the Senate of the Philippines
1946 – Joe Dante, American director and producer
1947 – Michel Berger, French singer-songwriter (d. 1992)
  1947   – Maria Farantouri, Greek singer and politician
  1947   – Gladys Kokorwe, Botswana politician and Speaker of The National Assembly
1948 – Beeb Birtles, Dutch-Australian singer-songwriter and guitarist
  1948   – Mick Channon, English footballer and horse trainer
  1948   – Agnieszka Holland, Polish film and television director and screenwriter
  1948   – Alan Lightman, American physicist, novelist, and academician
  1948   – Dick Morris, American political consultant, journalist, and author
1949 – Alexander Godunov, Russian-American actor and dancer (d. 1995)
  1949   – Paul Shaffer, Canadian-American singer, keyboard player, and bandleader
1950 – Ed Harris, American actor and producer
  1950   – Russell Alan Hulse, American physicist and astronomer, Nobel Prize laureate
1951 – Barbara Morgan, American educator and astronaut
1952 – S. Epatha Merkerson, American actress
1953 – Alistair Darling, English lawyer and politician, Chancellor of the Exchequer
  1953   – Helen De Michiel, American director and producer
  1953   – Sixto Lezcano, Puerto Rican-American baseball player and coach
  1953   – Gordon Marsden, English journalist and politician
1954 – Necip Hablemitoğlu, Turkish historian and academic (d. 2002)
1955 – Alessandro Altobelli, Italian footballer and sportscaster
  1955   – Adem Jashari, Kosovan commander (d. 1998)
1956 – Fiona Armstrong, English-Scottish journalist and author
  1956   – David Van Day, English singer
1957 – Peeter Järvelaid, Estonian historian and scholar
1958 – Kriss Akabusi, English sprinter and hurdler
  1958   – Dave Righetti, American baseball player and coach
1959 – Nancy Charest, Canadian lawyer and politician (d. 2014)
  1959   – Judd Nelson, American actor and screenwriter
  1959   – Stephen Roche, Irish cyclist and sportscaster
1960 – Jorge Domecq, Spanish lawyer and diplomat
  1960   – John Galliano, Gibraltar-born British fashion designer
  1960   – Andy Ritchie, English footballer and manager
  1960   – Kenny Wharton, English footballer and coach
1961 – Martin Clunes, English actor, singer, and director
  1961   – Alfonso Cuarón, Mexican director, producer, and screenwriter
1962 – Matt Cameron, American drummer and songwriter 
  1962   – Juan Carlos Rosero, Ecuadorian cyclist (d. 2013)
  1962   – Jon Stewart, American comedian, actor, and television host
1963 – Armando Iannucci, Scottish comedian, actor, director, and producer
  1963   – Andrew Jones, English politician
  1963   – Johnny Newman, American basketball player
  1963   – Walt Weiss, American baseball player and manager
1964 – Michael Bennet, Indian-American lawyer and politician
  1964   – John Burkett, American baseball player and bowler
  1964   – Roy Tarpley, American basketball player (d. 2015)
  1964   – Sian Williams, English-Welsh journalist
1965 – Erwin Mortier, Belgian author and poet
  1965   – Matt Williams, American baseball player and manager
1967 – Chris Heaton-Harris, English businessman and politician
  1967   – Anna Nicole Smith, American model, actress, and television personality (d. 2007)
  1967   – José del Solar, Peruvian footballer and manager
  1967   – Stephnie Weir, American actress and comedian
1968 – Darren Bett, English journalist
1969 – Nick Knight, English cricketer and sportscaster
  1969   – Robb Nen, American baseball player and manager
  1969   – Valeri Nikitin, Estonian wrestler
  1969   – Sonia O'Sullivan, Irish athlete
1970 – Álex López Morón, Spanish tennis player
  1970   – Richard Osman, English television host, director, and producer
1972 – Paulo Figueiredo, Angolan footballer
  1972   – Anastasia Kelesidou, German-Greek discus thrower
  1972   – Jesper Strömblad, Swedish guitarist and songwriter 
1973 – Jade Puget, American guitarist and producer 
1974 – apl.de.ap, Filipino-American singer and rapper
  1974   – András Tölcséres, Hungarian footballer and manager
1975 – Bakarhythm, Japanese comedian, actor, playwright, and composer
  1975   – Eka Kurniawan, Indonesian journalist and author
  1975   – Park Sung-bae, South Korean footballer
  1975   – Takashi Shimoda, Japanese footballer
  1975   – Sigurd Wongraven, Norwegian singer-songwriter, guitarist, and producer 
1976 – Ryan Kwanten, Australian actor
1977 – Marlon Broomes, English footballer
  1977   – Fabio Grosso, Italian footballer and manager
  1977   – Acer Nethercott, English rower (d. 2013)
  1977   – Gavin Rae, Scottish footballer
  1977   – Greg Somerville, New Zealand rugby player
  1977   – DeMya Walker, American basketball player
1978 – Brent Albright, American wrestler
  1978   – Darryl Flahavan, English footballer
  1978   – Freddie Mitchell, American football player
  1978   – Mehdi Nafti, Tunisian footballer
  1978   – Michael Simpkins, English footballer
  1978   – Haytham Tambal, Sudanese footballer
1979 – Chamillionaire, American rapper, entrepreneur, and investor
  1979   – Shy FX, English DJ and producer
  1979   – Katarzyna Strączy, Polish tennis player
1980 – Lisa Middelhauve, German singer-songwriter 
  1980   – Stuart Taylor, English footballer
1981 – Brian Tevreden, Dutch footballer
1982 – Leandro Barbosa, Brazilian basketball player
  1982   – Chris Harris, English motorcycle racer
  1982   – Raido Villers, Estonian basketball player
1983 – Rostam Batmanglij, American musician and songwriter
  1983   – Tyler Glenn, American singer-songwriter and keyboard player 
  1983   – Summer Rae, American football player, wrestler, and actress
  1983   – Édouard Roger-Vasselin, French tennis player
  1983   – Nelson Valdez, Paraguayan footballer
1984 – Andrew Bogut, Australian basketball player
  1984   – Marc-André Fleury, Canadian ice hockey player
  1984   – Trey Songz, American R&B singer-songwriter and actor
  1984   – Mary Elizabeth Winstead, American actress and producer
  1984   – Naoko Yamada, Japanese anime director
1985 – Mike Kostka, Canadian ice hockey player
  1985   – Álvaro Pereira, Uruguayan footballer
1986 – Mouhamadou Dabo, French footballer
1987 – Karen Gillan, Scottish actress
  1987   – Craig Kieswetter, South African-English cricketer and golfer
1988 – Scarlett Pomers, American actress and singer-songwriter
1989 – Laura Alleway, Australian footballer
  1989   – Jamie Buhrer, Australian rugby league player
1990 – Dedryck Boyata, Belgian footballer
  1990   – Bradley Smith, English motorcycle racer
1992 – Jake Miller, American singer-songwriter
  1992   – Adam Hicks, American actor
1993 – David Nofoaluma, Australian-Samoan rugby league player
1994 – Nao Hibino, Japanese tennis player
1995 – Chase Elliott, American race car driver
2000 – Jackson Yee, Chinese singer, dancer and actor

Deaths

Pre-1600
 741 – Pope Gregory III
 939 – Lady Ma, Chinese noblewoman (b. 890)
1039 – Adalbero, duke of Carinthia (b. 980)
1122 – Margrave Ottokar II of Styria
1170 – Owain Gwynedd, Welsh king (b. 1080)
1290 – Eleanor of Castile (b. 1241)
1317 – Yishan Yining, Zen monk and writer from China who taught in Japan (b. 1247)
1476 – James of the Marches, Franciscan friar
1499 – Edward Plantagenet, 17th Earl of Warwick (b. 1475)
1574 – Georg Major, German theologian and educator (b. 1502)
1585 – Hernando Franco, Spanish composer (b. 1532)

1601–1900
1667 – Jean de Thévenot, French linguist and botanist (b. 1633)
1675 – Basil Feilding, 2nd Earl of Denbigh, English soldier and politician (b. 1608)
  1675   – Leonard Hoar, English minister and academic (b. 1630)
1680 – Gian Lorenzo Bernini, Italian sculptor and painter (b. 1598)
  1680   – Giovanni Francesco Grimaldi, Italian painter and architect (b. 1606)
  1680   – Athanasius Kircher, German priest, philologist, and scholar (b. 1601)
1694 – Matsuo Bashō, Japanese poet and scholar (b. 1644)
1695 – Giovanni Paolo Colonna, Italian organist, composer, and educator (b. 1637)
  1695   – Anthony Wood, English historian and author (b. 1632)
1698 – Louis de Buade de Frontenac, French soldier and politician, 3rd Governor General of New France (b. 1622)
1763 – Naungdawgyi, Burmese king (b. 1734)
1785 – William Whipple, American general and politician (b. 1730)
1794 – Friedrich Wilhelm von Steuben, Prussian-American general (b. 1730)
  1794   – Sir James Tylney-Long, 7th Baronet, English politician (b. 1736)
1801 – Déodat Gratet de Dolomieu, French geologist and academic (b. 1750)
1815 – Johann Peter Salomon, German violinist, composer, and conductor (b. 1745)
1852 – Ludger Duvernay, French journalist and politician (b. 1799)
  1852   – Emmanuil Xanthos, Greek activist, co-founded Filiki Eteria (b. 1772)
1859 – Washington Irving, American short story writer, essayist, biographer, historian (b. 1783)
1870 – Frédéric Bazille, French soldier and painter (b. 1841)
1873 – Caterina Scarpellini, Italian astronomer and meteorologist (b. 1808)
1878 – Orson Hyde, American religious leader, 3rd President of the Quorum of the Twelve Apostles (b. 1805)
1880 – Aires de Ornelas e Vasconcelos, Portuguese archbishop (b. 1837)
1890 – Jyotirao Phule, Indian philosopher and activist (b. 1827)
1891 – Sir James Corry, 1st Baronet, British politician (b. 1826)
1893 – Talbot Baines Reed, English author (b. 1852)

1901–present
1901 – Moses Dickson, African-American abolitionist, soldier, minister, and founder of The Knights of Liberty (b. 1824)
1904 – Hermann de Pourtalès, Swiss sailor (b. 1847)
1907 – Stanisław Wyspiański, Polish playwright, poet, and painter (b. 1869)
1912 – Walter Benona Sharp, American businessman (b. 1870)
1917 – Mikelis Avlichos, Greek poet and scholar (b. 1844)
1921 – `Abdu'l-Bahá, Head of the Baháʼí Faith (b. 1844)
1930 – Constantine VI of Constantinople (b. 1859)
1935 – Erich von Hornbostel, Austrian musicologist and scholar (b. 1877)
1939 – James Naismith, Canadian-American physician and educator, created basketball (b. 1861)
1943 – Aleksander Hellat, Estonian lawyer and politician, 6th Estonian Minister of Foreign Affairs (b. 1881)
1945 – Dwight F. Davis, American tennis player and politician, 49th United States Secretary of War (b. 1879)
1947 – Philippe Leclerc de Hauteclocque, French general (b. 1902)
1953 – Frank Olson, American biologist and chemist (b. 1910)
1954 – Enrico Fermi, Italian-American physicist and academic, Nobel Prize laureate (b. 1901)
1960 – Dirk Jan de Geer, Dutch lawyer and politician, Prime Minister of the Netherlands (b. 1870)
  1960   – Tsunenohana Kan'ichi, Japanese sumo wrestler, the 31st Yokozuna (b. 1896)
  1960   – Richard Wright,  American novelist, short story writer, essayist, and poet (b. 1908)
1962 – K. C. Dey, Indian singer-songwriter and actor (b. 1893)
  1962   – Wilhelmina of the Netherlands (b. 1880)
1968 – Enid Blyton, English author and poet (b. 1897)
1971 – Wasfi al-Tal, Jordanian captain and politician, 34th Prime Minister of Jordan (b. 1920)
1972 – Havergal Brian, English composer (b. 1875)
1973 – Marthe Bibesco, Romanian-French author and poet (b. 1886)
1975 – Peder Furubotn, Norwegian Communist and anti-Nazi Resistance leader (b. 1890)
1976 – Rosalind Russell, American actress and singer (b. 1907)
1977 – Bob Meusel, American baseball player and sailor (b. 1896)
1978 – Antonio Vespucio Liberti, Argentinian businessman (b. 1902)
1982 – Helen of Greece and Denmark (b. 1896)
1983 – Christopher George, American actor (b. 1929)
1987 – Choh Hao Li, Chinese-American biologist and chemist (b. 1913)
  1987   – Kazuharu Sonoda, Japanese wrestler (b. 1956)
1992 – Sidney Nolan, Australian-English painter and academic (b. 1917)
1993 – Jerry Edmonton, Canadian-American drummer (b. 1946)
  1993   – Garry Moore, American comedian, television personality, and game show host (b. 1915)
1994 – Jeffrey Dahmer, American serial killer (b. 1960)
  1994   – Buster Edwards, English boxer and criminal (b. 1932)
  1994   – Jerry Rubin, American businessman and activist (b. 1938)
1995 – Joe Kelly, Irish race car driver (b. 1915)
1997 – Georges Marchal, French actor (b. 1920)
1998 – Kerry Wendell Thornley, American soldier and author (b. 1938)
2001 – Kal Mann, American songwriter (b. 1917)
  2001   – William Reid, Scottish lieutenant and pilot, Victoria Cross recipient (b. 1921)
2002 – Melih Cevdet Anday, Turkish poet and author (b. 1915)
2003 – Ted Bates, English footballer and manager (b. 1918)
  2003   – Antonia Forest, English author (b. 1915)
  2003   – Mihkel Mathiesen, Estonian engineer and politician (b. 1918)
2005 – Marc Lawrence, American actor, director, producer, and screenwriter (b. 1910)
  2005   – Jack Concannon, American football player and actor (b. 1943)
2007 – Gudrun Wagner, Prussian director and producer (b. 1944)
2008 – Havaldar Gajender Singh, Indian sergeant (b. 1972)
  2008   – Sandeep Unnikrishnan, Indian soldier (b. 1977)
2009 – Gilles Carle, Canadian director, producer, and screenwriter (b. 1928)
2010 – Leslie Nielsen, Canadian-American actor and producer (b. 1926)
2011 – Lloyd J. Old, American immunologist and academic (b. 1933)
2012 – Knut Ahnlund, Swedish historian, author, and academic (b. 1923)
  2012   – Spain Rodriguez, American illustrator (b. 1940)
  2012   – Franco Ventriglia, American opera singer (b. 1922)
  2012   – Zig Ziglar, American soldier and author (b. 1926)
2013 – Jack Matthews, American author, playwright, and academic (b. 1925)
  2013   – Mitja Ribičič, Italian-Slovenian soldier and politician, 25th Prime Minister of Yugoslavia (b. 1919)
  2013   – Jean-Louis Roux, Canadian actor and politician, 34th Lieutenant Governor of Quebec (b. 1923)
  2013   – Beyle Schaechter-Gottesman, Austrian-American poet and songwriter (b. 1920)
2014 – Chespirito, Mexican actor, director, producer, and screenwriter (b. 1929)
  2014   – Said Akl, Lebanese poet, playwright, and linguist (b. 1912)
  2014   – Dale Armstrong, Canadian race car driver (b. 1941)
2015 – Wayne Bickerton, Welsh songwriter and producer (b. 1941)
  2015   – Luc Bondy, Swiss director and producer (b. 1948)
  2015   – Gerry Byrne, English-Welsh footballer (b. 1938)
  2015   – Marjorie Lord, American actress (b. 1918)
  2015   – Olene Walker, American lawyer and politician, 15th Governor of Utah (b. 1930)
2018 – Harry Leslie Smith, British writer and political commentator (b. 1923)
2020 – David Prowse, English weight-lifting champion, actor and Green Cross Man (b. 1935)
2021 – Virgil Abloh, American fashion designer and entrepreneur (b. 1980)
  2021   – Frank Williams, British founder of Williams Grand Prix Engineering (b. 1942)

Holidays and observances
Albanian Flag Day, celebrate the independence of Albania from Turkey in 1912, the first Albanian flag raise by Skanderbeg in 1443, and for the new parliamentary constitution in 1998.
Bedfordshire day is celebrated in the county of Bedfordshire to celebrate the birth of John Bunyan
Bukovina Day (Romania)
Christian feast day:
Acacius, Hirenarchus, and companions, of Sebaste
Catherine Labouré
Feast of the Holy Sovereigns (Episcopal Diocese of Hawaii)
Herman of Alaska, the anniversary of his actual death. Eastern Orthodox
James of the Marches
Kamehameha and Emma (Episcopal Church (USA))
Our Lady of Kibeho
Pope Gregory III
Rufus (no. 8)
Stephen the Younger
November 28 (Eastern Orthodox liturgics)
Heroes' Day (Sri Lanka)
Hōonkō (Japan)
Independence Day (Mauritania), celebrate the independence of Mauritania from France in 1960.
Independence Day (Panama), celebrate the independence of Panama from Spain in 1821.
Navy Day (Iran)
Proclamation of Independence Day (East Timor), celebrate the independence of East Timor from Portugal in 1975.
Republic Day (Burundi)
Republic Day (Chad)

References

External links

 
 
 

Days of the year
November